Vzkriesenie (1960) is an opera by Ján Cikker. It is based on Leo Tolstoy's last novel, Resurrection (1899).

References

External links 

1960 operas
Slovak-language operas
Operas
Operas by Ján Cikker
Operas based on works by Leo Tolstoy